This list of places in Scotland is a complete collection of lists of places in Scotland.

List of burghs in Scotland
List of census localities in Scotland
List of islands of Scotland
List of Shetland islands
List of Orkney islands
List of Inner Hebrides
List of Outer Hebrides
List of outlying islands of Scotland
List of freshwater islands in Scotland
List of rivers of Scotland
List of lochs in Scotland
Waterfalls of Scotland
List of Munros
Extreme points of Scotland

Lists of places within Scottish local authorities
List of places in Aberdeen
List of places in Aberdeenshire
List of places in Angus
List of places in Argyll and Bute
List of places in Clackmannanshire
List of places in Dumfries and Galloway
List of places in Dundee
List of places in East Ayrshire
List of places in East Dunbartonshire
List of places in East Lothian
List of places in East Renfrewshire
List of places in na h-Eileanan Siar (Western Isles)
List of places in Falkirk (council area)
List of places in Fife
List of places in Glasgow
List of places in Highland
List of places in Inverclyde
List of places in Midlothian
List of places in Moray
List of places in North Ayrshire
List of places in North Lanarkshire
List of places in Orkney
List of places in Perth and Kinross
List of places in Renfrewshire
List of places in the Scottish Borders
List of places in Shetland
List of places in South Ayrshire
List of places in South Lanarkshire
List of places in Stirling (district)
List of places in West Dunbartonshire
List of places in West Lothian

See also

Scottish toponymy
Counties of Scotland
Lieutenancy areas of Scotland
List of generic forms in British place names
Subdivisions of Scotland
United Nations Group of Experts on Geographical Names
Shieling

 
 
Places in Scotland